Faultline is the second album of the American Avant-rock band Birdsongs of the Mesozoic, released in 1989 by Cuneiform Records.

The album was a transitional one for the band, as it was their first recording after the departure of Birdsongs co-founder Roger Miller who had been replaced by saxophonist Steve Adams. Adams soon left the band to join the saxophone quartet ROVA and was in turn replaced by Ken Field. Both Adams and Field recorded material for Faultline. The introduction of a saxophone also tilted the band’s soundslightly towards jazz.

Track listing

Personnel
Adapted from Faultline liner notes.

Birdsongs of the Mesozoic
Steve Adams – tenor saxophone, alto saxophone, synthesizer, bass clarinet, drum machine, percussion
Erik Lindgren – piano, sampler, trumpet, drum machine
Ken Field – alto saxophone, soprano saxophone, percussion
Rick Scott – synthesizer, percussion, piano
Martin Swope – guitar, sampler, art direction
Additional musicians
Willie Alexander – percussion (9, 10)

Production and additional personnel
Birdsongs of the Mesozoic – production
Kathy Chapman – photography
Roger Seibel – mastering
Ken Winokur – photography
Bob Winsor – production, engineering

Release history

References

External links 
 
 Faultline at Bandcamp

1989 albums
Birdsongs of the Mesozoic albums
Cuneiform Records albums